This Property Is Condemned is a 1966 American drama film directed by Sydney Pollack and starring Natalie Wood, Robert Redford, Kate Reid, Charles Bronson, Robert Blake and Mary Badham. The screenplay, inspired by the 1946 one-act play of the same name by Tennessee Williams, was written by Francis Ford Coppola, Fred Coe and Edith Sommer. The film was released by Paramount Pictures.

The Depression-era story takes place in the fictional Mississippi town of Dodson. Owen Legate (Robert Redford), a representative of the railroad that provides much of the economic base for the town, comes to Dodson on an unpopular errand. Natalie Wood plays Alva Starr, a pretty flirt who finds herself stuck in the small town and is attracted to the handsome stranger.

For her performance, Natalie Wood received a Golden Globe nomination for Best Actress in a Motion Picture Drama. The film itself received mixed reviews.

The film is noted for its song "Wish me a Rainbow", written by Jay Livingston and Ray Evans, which is heard at the beginning and the ending of the film. Ed Ames, Gilberto Astrudo, and Lawrence Welk have all recorded cover versions.

Plot

The film starts with a frame story in which an unkempt girl, Willie Starr, tells the story of her sister Alva to Tom, a boy whom she meets on the abandoned railroad tracks of Dodson, Mississippi in the 1930s.

A stranger, Owen Legate, arrives in the small town of Dodson and makes his way to the Starr Boarding House, where a loud birthday party is in progress for the landlady, Mrs. Hazel "Mama" Starr. He meets Willie, the youngest daughter of the house, and rents a room for the week, while remaining mysterious about his motives for being in town. It soon emerges that the eldest daughter, Alva, is the "main attraction" at the party. Mr. Johnson, the oldest and richest railroad station worker, is eagerly awaiting her arrival. When Alva finally appears, many men greet her and try to attract her attention or to dance with her, including J.J., Mama's boyfriend.

Alva and Owen first meet in the kitchen, where she tells a fanciful story about one of the workers taking her dancing at the Peabody Hotel in Memphis. Willie is entranced, but Owen suspects that the story is fictitious. It becomes obvious that Alva is eager to leave Dodson and dreams of going to New Orleans, from where Owen has come. Later, Alva enters Owen's room on a false pretense and begins confiding in him. He discourages her, suggesting that she is no more than a prostitute, and she leaves in tears. Mama explains to Alva that she must be kind to Mr. Johnson, who has promised to look after her.

The next day, Willie, who is skipping Vacation Bible School, sees Owen on his way to work. The purpose of Owen's visit to Dodson is to lay off several railroad employees as a result of cutbacks made necessary by the Depression. In the evening, Mr. Johnson is waiting again for Alva to get ready for their date, but she is avoiding it. She makes an excuse to get him to go inside, then leads Owen into the garden to show him her father's red-headed scarecrow. Owen confronts Alva about her arrangement with Mama, which Alva won't admit to. She runs back angrily to Mr. Johnson and invites everyone in the house to go swimming in the nude. J.J. manages to get Alva alone and comes on to her. He tells her Owen has come to lay off most of the town. The workers grow increasingly hostile toward Legate, but Owen and Alva eventually become closer. They visit an abandoned train car decorated by Alva's father and Alva talks once again of her dream to leave the town. When Owen is beaten up by the laid-off men, Alva takes care of him and the two spend the night together.

Meanwhile, Mama has arranged for the family to accompany Mr. Johnson to Memphis, where he will take care of them. She will not let Alva go to New Orleans with Owen. When Alva protests, Mama persuades Owen to believe he has been deceived and that Alva was planning to go to Memphis all along. Mama, J.J., Alva, and Mr. Johnson go out to celebrate their new arrangement. Drunk and angered, Alva confronts J.J. and gets him to admit that he stays with Mrs. Starr to be with her. That night, Alva marries J.J., but the next morning she steals his money and their marriage license and runs away to New Orleans.

In New Orleans, Alva eventually finds Owen, and they share happy days together. When Owen is offered a job in Chicago, he proposes marriage to Alva and sends for Willie. But one day, the two come home to find Mama, who wants to take Alva back and involve her in a new scheme. She reveals to Owen that Alva had married J.J., something that Owen finds hard to believe. Alva runs out into the rain, crying.

Willie finishes telling her story to Tom on the railroad tracks. Willie, who now wears her sister's clothes and jewelry, explains that Alva (using a malapropism) died of "lung affection". Mama has gone away with a man and Willie lives on her own in the abandoned boarding house.

Cast

 Natalie Wood as Alva Starr
 Robert Redford as Owen Legate
 Charles Bronson as J.J. Nichols
 Kate Reid as Hazel Starr
 Mary Badham as Willie Starr
 Alan Baxter as Knopke
 Robert Blake as Sidney
 Dabney Coleman as Salesman (scenes deleted)
 John Harding as Johnson
 Ray Hemphill as Jim
 Brett Pearson as Charlie
 Jon Provost as Tom
 Bob Random as Tiny
 Quentin Sondergaard as Hank
 Mike Steen as Max
 Bruce Watson as Lindsay Tate

Awards and nominations

See also
List of American films of 1966

References

External links 
 
 

1966 films
1966 romantic drama films
American romantic drama films
Films based on works by Tennessee Williams
Films directed by Sydney Pollack
Films scored by Kenyon Hopkins
Films set in the 1930s
Films set in Mississippi
Films shot in Mississippi
Films shot in New Orleans
Paramount Pictures films
Southern Gothic films
1960s English-language films
1960s American films